Lamarchea hakeifolia is a member of the family Myrtaceae endemic to Western Australia.

It blooms between August and January producing orange-yellow or green-red flowers.

It is found on sand dunes and undulating plains along the west coast of the Mid West and Gascoyne regions of Western Australia in an area between Carnarvon and Northampton where it grows in sandy to loamy soils.

There are two known varieties of the species:
 Lamarchea hakeifolia var. brevifolia	
 Lamarchea hakeifolia var. hakeifolia

References

Myrtaceae
Endemic flora of Western Australia
Plants described in 1830